The 1972 Indiana State Sycamores football team represented Indiana State University in the 1972 NCAA College Division  football season. It was the seventh and final season for head coach Jerry Huntsman. He won his fifth homecoming contest in front of a record crowd (17,230).  The Sycamores finished the season on a five-game winning streak, narrowly missing a bid to the Boardwalk Bowl; they missed a win against University Division opponent Cincinnati by dropping a touchdown pass in the end zone within the last minute of play (see game film below); they outscored the opposition 236–141.  Huntsman referred to it as his best team at Indiana State. Three Sycamores were named All-Americans after the season; Bob Poss, (offensive guard) was selected for the Associated Press’ 2nd Team; Seniors Willie Lee (fullback) and John Karazsia (linebacker) were Honorable Mentions on the Associated Press team.

Lee staged a memorable senior campaign, establishing school records in yard rushing (957), touchdowns (13) and points (78). He had four 100+ yard rushing games, while the rest of the team combined for three. He led all Indiana collegiate players in scoring, while leading the Sycamores' rushing attack to a school record in rushing offense (2,647 yards). Lee was drafted by the Pittsburgh Steelers but would sign instead with the Winnipeg Blue Bombers.

Junior Rick Murphy, a defensive back, led the nation in return yardage; he went on to a career in the World Football League (WFL).

Schedule

Game Films
1972 Indiana State - Cincinnati Football Game Film

References

Indiana State
Indiana State Sycamores football seasons
Indiana State Sycamores football